Yuryi Liadov (born 3 December 1987) is a Belarusian biathlete. He was born in Minsk. He competed at the Biathlon World Championships 2012 and 2013, and at the 2014 Winter Olympics in Sochi, in sprint and pursuit.

References

External links

1987 births
Living people
Sportspeople from Minsk
Biathletes at the 2014 Winter Olympics
Belarusian male biathletes
Olympic biathletes of Belarus
Paralympic sighted guides